In Hindu astronomy, there are 27 nakshatras , or sectors along the ecliptic. A list of them is first found in the Vedanga Jyotisha, a text dated to the final centuries BCE. The Nakṣatra system predates the influence of Hellenistic astronomy on Vedic tradition, which became prevalent from about the 2nd century CE. There are various systems of enumerating the Nakṣatra-s; although there are 27-28 days to a sidereal month, by custom only 27 days are used. The following list gives the corresponding regions of sky. Names of the months in Indian national calendar is related to the names of Nakshatras.

Padas (quarters)
The 27 Nakshatras cover 13°20’ of the ecliptic each. Each Nakshatra is also divided into quarters or padas of 3°20’, and the below table lists the appropriate starting sound to name the child. The 27 nakshatras, each with 4 padas, give 108, which is the number of beads in a Japa mala, indicating all the elements (ansh) of Vishnu:

Names in Indian and Asian languages
The names of nakshatras in other languages are adapted from the Sanskrit variation (apabhramsa) through Pali or Prakrit. The variations evolved for easier pronunciation in popular usage.

References

Nakshatras
Horoscopic astrology
Nakshatra
Astrology-related lists